Flame is the second studio album from the Australian band Real Life. It was released in October 1985 on Glenn Wheatley's Wheatley Records in Australia. The album peaked at No. 42 on the Australian Kent Music Report.

Reception

Tomas Mureika from AllMusic said "David Sterry and Richard Zatorski again have assembled a collection of solid synth pop singles-that-could-have-been" adding "The hooky verses and singalong chorus were designed for radio play, but it was not meant to be."

Track listing
All songs written by David Sterry and Richard Zatorski.

Charts

Release history

References

1985 albums
Real Life (band) albums